A dominant-party system, or one-party dominant system, is a political occurrence in which a single political party continuously dominates election results over running opposition groups or parties. Any ruling party staying in power for more than one consecutive term may be considered a dominant party (also referred to as a predominant or hegemonic party). Some dominant parties were called the natural governing party, given their length of time in power.

Dominant-parties and their domination of a state, develop out of one-sided electoral and party constellations within a multi-party system (particularly under presidential systems of governance), and as such differ from states under a one-party system, which are intricately organized around a specific party. Sometimes the term "de facto one-party state" is used to describe dominant-party systems which, unlike a one-party system, allows (at least nominally) democratic multiparty elections, but the existing practices or balance of political power effectively prevent the opposition from winning power, thus resembling a one-party state. 
Dominant-party systems differ from the political dynamics of other dominant multi-party constellations such as consociationalism, grand coalitions and two-party systems, which are characterized and sustained by narrow or balanced competition and cooperation.

Between 1950 and 2017, more than 130 countries were included in the list of dominant-party systems at different times.

Theory
Dominant-party systems are commonly based on majority rule for proportional representation or majority boosting in semi-proportional representation. Plurality voting systems can result in large majorities for a party with a lower percentage of the vote than in proportional representation systems due to a fractured opposition (resulting in wasted votes and a lower number of parties entering the legislature) and gerrymandering.

Critics of the "dominant party" theory argue that it views the meaning of democracy as given, and that it assumes that only a particular conception of representative democracy (in which different parties alternate frequently in power) is valid. Raymond Suttner, himself a former leader of the African National Congress (ANC), argues that "the dominant party 'system' is deeply flawed as a mode of analysis and lacks explanatory capacity. But it is also a very conservative approach to politics. Its fundamental political assumptions are restricted to one form of democracy, namely electoral politics, and display hostility towards popular politics. This is manifest in the obsession with the quality of electoral opposition, and its sidelining or ignoring of popular political activity organised in other ways. The assumption in this approach is that other forms of organisation and opposition are of limited importance or a separate matter from the consolidation of their version of democracy."

One of the dangers of dominant parties is "the tendency of dominant parties to conflate party and state and to appoint party officials to senior positions irrespective of their having the required qualities." However, in some countries this is common practice even when there is no dominant party. In contrast to one-party systems, dominant-party systems can occur within a context of a democratic system as well as an authoritarian one. In a one-party system other parties are banned, but in dominant-party systems other political parties are tolerated, and (in democratic dominant-party systems) operate without overt legal impediment, but do not have a realistic chance of winning; the dominant party genuinely wins the votes of the vast majority of voters every time (or, in authoritarian systems, claims to). Under authoritarian dominant-party systems, which may be referred to as "electoralism" or "soft authoritarianism", opposition parties are legally allowed to operate, but are too weak or ineffective to seriously challenge power, perhaps through various forms of corruption, constitutional quirks that intentionally undermine the ability for an effective opposition to thrive, institutional and/or organizational conventions that support the status quo, occasional but not omnipresent political repression, or inherent cultural values averse to change.

In some states opposition parties are subject to varying degrees of official harassment and most often deal with restrictions on free speech (such as press laws), lawsuits against the opposition, and rules or electoral systems (such as gerrymandering of electoral districts) designed to put them at a disadvantage. In some cases outright electoral fraud keeps the opposition from power. On the other hand, some dominant-party systems occur, at least temporarily, in countries that are widely seen, both by their citizens and outside observers, to be textbook examples of democracy. An example of a genuine democratic dominant-party system would be the pre-Emergency India, which was almost universally viewed by all as being a democratic state, even though the only major national party at that time was the Indian National Congress. The reasons why a dominant-party system may form in such a country are often debated: supporters of the dominant party tend to argue that their party is simply doing a good job in government and the opposition continuously proposes unrealistic or unpopular changes, while supporters of the opposition tend to argue that the electoral system disfavors them (for example because it is based on the principle of first past the post), or that the dominant party receives a disproportionate amount of funding from various sources and is therefore able to mount more persuasive campaigns. In states with ethnic issues, one party may be seen as being the party for an ethnicity or race with the party for the majority ethnic, racial or religious group dominating, e.g., the African National Congress in South Africa (governing since the end of apartheid in 1994) has strong support amongst Bantu peoples of South Africa and the Ulster Unionist Party governed Northern Ireland from its creation in 1921 until 1972 with the support of the Protestant majority. Similarly, the Apartheid-era National Party in South Africa had the support of Afrikaners who make up the majority of White South Africans while English-speaking white South Africans tended towards more liberal and reform-oriented parties like the Progressive Federal Party.

Sub-national entities are often dominated by one party due to the area's demographic being on one end of the spectrum or espousing a unique local identity. For example, the current elected government of the District of Columbia has been governed by Democrats since its creation in the 1970s, Bavaria by the Christian Social Union since 1957, Madeira by the Social Democrats since 1976, and Alberta by the Progressive Conservatives from 1971 to 2015. On the other hand, where the dominant party rules nationally on a genuinely democratic basis, the opposition may be strong in one or more subnational areas, possibly even constituting a dominant party locally; an example is South Africa, where although the African National Congress is dominant at the national level, the opposition Democratic Alliance is strong to dominant in the Province of Western Cape.

Methods of dominant-party governments 
In dominant-party governments, they use institutional channels, rather than repression, to influence the population. Coercive distribution can control citizens and economic elites through land reform, poverty alleviation, public health, housing, education, and employment programs. Further, they distribute private goods to the winning coalition (people who are necessary for its reign) in order to stay in power. Giving the winning coalition private goods also prevents civil conflict. They also use the education system to teach and uphold compliance. The recruiting, disciplining, and training of teachers allow for authoritarian governments to control teachers into following their objective: to foster compliance from the youth. Another way that they maintain control is through hosting elections. Even though they would not be fair elections, hosting them allows citizens to feel that they have some control and a political outlet. They can also enhance rule within their own state through international collaboration, by supporting and gaining the support, especially economic support, of other similar governments.

Current dominant-party systems

Africa

 Popular Movement for the Liberation of Angola, Movimento Popular de Libertação de Angola (MPLA): In power since independence, November 11, 1975; sole legal party, 1975–91
 Formerly led by President José Eduardo dos Santos (in office from September 10, 1979, to August 28, 2017) and now led by João Lourenço.
 Presidential election, 1992: dos Santos (MPLA-PT) won 49.6% of the vote. As this was not an absolute majority, a runoff against Jonas Savimbi (40.1%) was required, but did not take place. Dos Santos remained in office without democratic legitimacy.
 New constitution, 2010: popular election of president abolished in favour of a rule that the top candidate of the most voted party in parliamentary elections becomes president.
 Parliamentary election, 2017: MPLA 61.11% and 150 of 220 seats.

Botswana Democratic Party (BDP): Led by President Mokgweetsi Masisi, in office since April 1, 2018
 In power since independence in 1966, first elected March 3, 1965
 Parliamentary election, 2019: BDP 52.65% and 38 of 57 seats
 Local elections, 2009: BDP 333 of 490 seats
 
 National Council for the Defense of Democracy-Forces for the Defense of Democracy (CNDD-FDD) In power since 2005
 Led by President Évariste Ndayishimiye, in office since June 18, 2020
 Presidential election, 2020: CNDD-FDD 71.45%

 Cameroon People's Democratic Movement (Rassemblement Démocratique et Populaire du Cameroun, RDPC): Led by President Paul Biya, in office since November 6, 1982
 In power, under various names, since independence, January 1, 1960 (Sole legal party, 1966–1990)
 Presidential election, 2018: Paul Biya (RDPC) 71.28%
 Parliamentary election, 2020: RDPC 139 of 180 seats

 Congolese Party of Labour (Parti Congolais du Travail, PCT): Led by President Denis Sassou-Nguesso, in office from February 8, 1979, to August 31, 1992, and since October 15, 1997
 In power, under various names, from 1969 to 1992 and since 1997 (Sole legal party, 1963–1990)
 Parliamentary election, 2017: PCT 90 of 139 seats
 Presidential election, 2016: Denis Sassou-Nguesso (PCT) 60.19%

 People's Rally for Progress (Rassemblement Populaire pour de Progrès, RPP)
 Led by President Ismail Omar Guelleh, in office since May 8, 1999
 In power since its formation in 1979 (Sole legal party, 1979–1992)
 Parliamentary election, 2018: RPP in coalition, 87.83% and 57 of 65 seats
 Presidential election, 2016: Ismail Omar Guelleh (RPP) 87.07%

 Democratic Party of Equatorial Guinea (Partido Democrático de Guinea Ecuatorial, PDGE)
 Led by President Teodoro Obiang Nguema Mbasogo, in office since August 3, 1979: In power since its formation in 1987 (Sole legal party, 1987–1991)
 Senate election, 2017: PDGE 92.00% 55 of 70 seats (Includes 15 unelected representatives appointed by the president.)
 Chamber of People's Representatives election, 2017: PDGE 92.00% 99 of 100 seats
 Presidential election, 2016: Teodoro Obiang Nguema Mbasogo (PDGE) 93.53%

Prosperity Party, previously Ethiopian People's Revolutionary Democratic Front (EPRDF): Led by Prime Minister Abiy Ahmed, in office since April 2, 2018
 In power since May 28, 1991 (party reorganization 2019)
 Parliamentary election, 2015: 500 of 547 seats (546 of 547 seats including allies)
 Regional election, 2015: Regional partners 1987 of 1990 seats

 Gabonese Democratic Party (Parti Démocratique Gabonais, PDG): Led by President Ali Bongo Ondimba, in office since October 16, 2009
 In power, under various names, since November 28, 1958 (Sole legal party, 1968–1991)
 Parliamentary election, 2018: PDG 98 of 120 seats
 Presidential election, 2016: Ali Bongo Ondimba 49.8%

 Mozambican Liberation Front (FRELIMO)
 Led by President Filipe Nyusi, in office since January 15, 2015 
 In power since independence, June 25, 1975 (Sole legal party, 1975–1990)
 Presidential election, 2019: Filipe Nyusi (FRELIMO) 73.46%
 Parliamentary election, 2019: FRELIMO 71.28% and 184 of 250 seats

 South West Africa People's Organisation (SWAPO)
 Led by President Hage Geingob, in office since March 21, 2015
 In power since independence, March 21, 1990
 Presidential election, 2019: Hage Geingob (SWAPO) 56.3%
 Parliamentary election, 2019: SWAPO 63 of 96 seats
 Local elections, 2015: SWAPO 112 of 121 seats
 Regional elections, 2015: SWAPO 277 of 378 seats

 Rwandan Patriotic Front (RPF)
 Led by President Paul Kagame, in office since March 24, 2000
 In power since July 19, 1994
 Presidential election, 2017: Paul Kagame (RPF) 98.79%
 Parliamentary election, 2018: RPF 73.95% and 40 of 80 seats

 African National Congress (ANC)
 Led by President Cyril Ramaphosa, in office since February 15, 2018
 In power since May 10, 1994
 Parliamentary election, 2019: ANC 57.50% and 230 of 400 seats
 Municipal elections, 2021: ANC 47.52%

 Sudan People's Liberation Movement (SPLM)
 Led by President Salva Kiir Mayardit, in office since July 9, 2011; and was President of Southern Sudan since July 30, 2005
 In power since independence, July 9, 2011; and in the autonomous Government of Southern Sudan since formation, July 9, 2005
 Presidential election, 2010: Salva Kiir Mayardit (SPLM) 92.99%
 Parliamentary election, 2010: SPLM 160 of 170 seats
 

 Chama Cha Mapinduzi (CCM): Led by President Samia Suluhu Hassan, in office since March 19, 2021
 In power, under various names, since independence, December 9, 1961 (Sole legal party, 1964–1992)
 Civic election, 2014: CCM 74.50%
 Presidential election, 2015: John Magufuli (CCM) 58.46%
 Parliamentary election, 2015: CCM 252 of 367 seats

 Union for the Republic (UNIR): Led by President Faure Gnassingbé, in office since February 5, 2005
 In power since its formation in 2012 
 Presidential election, 2020: Faure Gnassingbé (UNIR) 70.78%
 Parliamentary election, 2018: UNIR 59 of 91 seats

 National Resistance Movement (NRM): Led by President Yoweri Museveni, in office since January 29, 1986.
 In power as de facto dominant party since January 29, 1986, as a "non-party Movement."
 Became de jure dominant party with the return of multi-party elections on July 28, 2005.
 Presidential election, 2016: Yoweri Museveni (NRM) 60.62%
 Parliamentary election, 2016: NRM 293 of 426 seats

 The Polisario Front is the only political party represented in the government in exile of the Sahrawi Arab Democratic Republic (headquartered in neighbouring Algeria)
 Legislative election, 2012: 53 of 53 Seats
 Other parties are permitted in the Sahrawi constitution, but currently none exist, effectively making the SADR a one-party state
 The United Nations has designated the Polisario Front to be the sole legitimate representative of the Sahrawi people

Zimbabwe African National Union – Patriotic Front (ZANU-PF): Formerly led by President Robert Mugabe, in office from April 18, 1980, to November 21, 2017 (as president since December 31, 1987) and now led by Emmerson Mnangagwa since November 24, 2017. In power since independence, April 17, 1980
 Presidential election, 2018: Emmerson Mnangagwa (ZANU-PF) 50.8%
 House of Assembly election, 2018: ZANU-PF 179 of 270 elective seats 
 Senate election, 2018: ZANU-PF 43.8% and won 34 of 80 elective seats

Americas
 
 The Barbuda People's Movement has ruled the island of Barbuda since 1979, and has won every election for the island's seat in the national House of Representatives except for the 2004 and 2009 elections.
 
 The Justicialist Party has won every gubernatorial election since 1973 in the provinces of Formosa, La Pampa, San Luis, Santa Cruz and La Rioja. 
 The Neuquén People's Movement has won every gubernatorial election since 1962 in the province of Neuquén
  
 Movement Toward Socialism (MAS) from 2006 to 2019 and came back to power in 2020. 
 2020 Bolivian general election: Luis Arce: 55.10%, won 75 chamber seats and 21 senate seats

: has been dominated by the Brazilian Social Democracy Party since 1994, until election of Tarcísio de Freitas in 2022.
: the Workers' Party has won every gubernatorial election since 2006.
 
 : Johnny Araya is the Mayor of San Jose since 1998 and is a member of the National Liberation Party. Araya only resign his office for a short period of time to be presidential candidate in the 2014 Costa Rican general election and was reelected back to mayor in the following 2016 San José mayoral election although using a local party as he was temporarily banned from PLN, he returned to PLN soon after the election.
  Curridabat: 21st Century Curridabat has elected all Curridabat mayors since direct mayor elections exist in Costa Rica in 2002.
 
 Dominica Labour Party: Led by Roosevelt Skerrit and Charles Savarin
 In power since 2000
 2019 Dominican general election: 58.95% and won 18 of 21 seats
 
 The Institutional Revolutionary Party (PRI) has won every gubernatorial election in the states of Coahuila, Colima, Campeche, Hidalgo and the State of Mexico since its foundation in 1929.
 The National Action Party (PAN) has dominated politics in the state of Guanajuato since 1991, winning every gubernatorial election since 1995.
 
 FSLN: Led by Daniel Ortega. Presidency since 2007 (and 1979–1990) mayor of every major city, including Managua, majorities in most departments. 
 Local elections, 2012: 75.7% and 127 of 153 seats
 General election, 2016: Daniel Ortega 72.5%
 National election, 2016: 66.8%
 Constituency election, 2016: 65.7%
 Central American Parliament, 2016: 68.6%
 
Unity Labor Party: Led by Prime Minister Ralph Gonsalves.
In power since 2001
2020 Vincentian general election: 49.6% (lost popular vote) and won 9 of 15 seats.

 United Socialist Party of Venezuela led Great Patriotic Pole: In power since 1999, led by Hugo Chavez, then Nicolás Maduro
 2017 Venezuelan Constituent Assembly election: won 538 of 545 seats
 2017 Venezuelan regional elections: 52.7%
 2017 Venezuelan municipal elections: GPP 71.31% and won 306 of 365 seats
 2018 Venezuelan presidential election: Nicolás Maduro 67.8%
 2020 Venezuelan parliamentary election: GPP claimed 70% of the seats.
As of 2021, legislative, judiciary and executive are de facto controlled by Maduro's party

Canada 
Canada's lower house, the House of Commons of the Parliament of Canada, is a multi-party system. Multiple political parties are represented; however, every federal election since World War II has seen in essence only two federal parties win enough seats to form a government: the Liberal Party, and various iterations of a conservative party including the now defunct Progressive Conservative Party of Canada and the modern Conservative Party, which governed from 2006 to 2015.

With the emergence and strengthening of regional, and other non-traditional parties such as the Bloc Québécois following the Meech Lake Accord and the New Democratic Party, which have both served as the Official Opposition, both the Liberal and Conservative Party have relied on unofficial support from these smaller parties when in minority governments.

The Liberal Party of Canada has nonetheless been dominant in federal politics of Canada since its founding. So much so, that critics and academics alike have sometimes described the Liberal Party as "Canada's natural governing party". , the Liberal Party of Canada had governed for 86 of the past 126 years. Canada's 23rd prime minister, Justin Trudeau, is the 13th Liberal to serve as prime minister. The party ruled between 1896 to 1911, from 1921 to 1930 (except a few months), from 1935 to 1957, from 1963 to 1984 (except for a brief period from 1979 to 1980) and 1993 to 2006. In early 2006, the newly formed Conservative Party of Canada were elected, governing until 2015. After a nearly a decade in opposition, the Liberals returned to power following the 2015 election and were subsequently re-elected as minority governments in the 2019 election and the 2021 election.

At the provincial level, dominant party systems were once common with single party governments holding power for decades in BC, Alberta, Saskatchewan, Manitoba and Ontario. However, at present (2022) only the Province of Saskatchewan could be described as having a dominant party system.
  has seen the centre-right Saskatchewan Party win four consecutive elections in 2007, 2011, 2016, and 2020; with a majority government secured for the party in each of them. The Saskatchewan Party won 48 of the 61 seats in the 2020 election. Prior to the emergence of the Saskatchewan Party, the province's politics were dominated by the left-leaning, social democratic Saskatchewan NDP (and its predecessor the CCF), which governed from 1944-1964, 1971-1982 and 1991-2007. The Saskatchewan NDP remains the only opposition party in the Saskatchewan Legislature.

United States 

As a whole, the US has a two-party system, with the main parties since the mid-19th century being Democratic Party and the Republican Party. However, some states and cities have been dominated by one of these parties for up to several decades, and during the 20th century, Democrats dominated Congress for 60 years.

Some parts of the US have differing party systems and third-party representation. Most notably the two main parties in Puerto Rico (home to 3 million Americans) are the New Progressive Party and the Popular Democratic Party, with 3 minor parties represented after the 2020 election.

Dominant-party systems can also exist on Indian reservations. The Seneca Nation of Indians, a tribe with territory within the bounds of the State of New York, has had the Seneca Party as the dominant party in its political system for several decades.

Congress 

For 62 years from 1933 until 1995, the United States Congress was dominated by the Democratic Party. During this period, Republicans only held a majority in the House of Representatives for a total of 4 years: 1947–49 and 1953–55. In the Senate, Republicans held a majority for a total of 10 years: 1947–49, 1953–55 and 1981–87. This was largely due to the enduring popularity of the New Deal introduced by the Democratic Party during the Great Depression, and supported by the New Deal Coalition – a broad coalition of many different types of voters who all supported the Democratic Party's economic policies. The New Deal Coalition fractured in the mid-1960s and by the mid-1990s the Democrats had lost control of Congress in the "Republican Revolution."

Gerrymandering has also been a feature of politics for the House of Representatives, allowing parties to sometimes retain or gain a majority of seats, even when losing the popular vote nationally.

Following the 2020 elections, Democrats retained their majority in the House, although with reduced seats. After winning two runoff elections in the state of Georgia they got an effective 50/50 tie in the Senate (counting two independents who caucus with the Democrats). This meant the Vice President (Kamala Harris, a Democrat) was allowed to cast a vote as a tie-breaker, in the event of a 50–50 tie.

Presidency 

No party has dominated the Presidency since the end of the First Party System in the 1820s. The Democratic-Republican party controlled the Presidency for the longest period (24 years from 1801 until it splintered during and after the election of 1824), and its presidential candidate faced no organized opposition in 1820. Since then no party has had their candidates control the Presidency for more than 20 years in a row (the Democratic Party from 1933 to 1953), and since 1953 no party has controlled the presidency for more than 12 years in a row (the Republican Party from 1981 to 1993). The longest-serving President was Democrat Franklin D. Roosevelt who served three consecutive terms from 1933 to 1945. Roosevelt was elected to a fourth term but died two months after inauguration. In 1951, the U.S. ratified the 22nd Amendment which limits a person to two full terms as President, but does not prevent candidates from one party from dominating the Presidency by winning consecutive elections.

The US uses an Electoral College system to elect its President, where votes in low population states have more weight. As a result, it's possible to win the Presidential election while another candidate wins more votes, nationally. In 1876, 1888, 2000 and 2016, a Republican candidate won the election and became President, while a Democrat received more votes.

Southern United States 

Historically, the Southern United States was dominated by the Democratic Party, and in particular sub-factions called the Southern Democrats and Solid South. This began prior to the American Civil War but was especially from the end of the Reconstruction Era in 1877 to the election of Republican President Herbert Hoover in 1928, who won five of the eleven former Confederate states. Southern Democrats originally supported the enslavement of African Americans, then after the American Civil War and Reconstruction, supported Jim Crow laws designed to heavily oppress and politically disenfranchise millions of black Americans.

In the 1960s, northern Democrats, including Southern Democratic President Lyndon B. Johnson and his predecessor John F. Kennedy, supported the civil rights movement and passage of the Civil Rights Act, which alienated the Southern Democrats. Later, the Republican Party developed a southern strategy to gain support among the newly disaffected Southern voters, by appealing to conservative cultural values, such as opposition to abortion. This led to the South eventually becoming dominated overall by the Republican Party, although intra-state politics remain dominated by the Democratic Party well into the 2000s and even former segregationists such as Robert Byrd were elected to the U.S. Senate from that party.

Urban-rural divide 

In the 21st century, there is increasingly an urban-rural split where large urban areas tend to be dominated by Democrats and rural areas tend to be dominated by Republicans. This tends to hold true despite the overall leanings of the state or territory. That is, rural areas tend to vote Republican even in otherwise Democrat-dominated states, while urban areas tend to vote Democrat even in Republican-dominated states. This trend is increasing over time, with rural areas growing more heavily Republican, and inner city areas growing more heavily Democratic.

Red and blue states 

Some states have been dominated by a single party for a long period of time. States which have a long record of being dominated by one party are often called red or blue states, after the colour representing their dominant party (red for Republicans, blue for Democrats). Some states lie in the middle, not being heavily dominated by either party. States where elections are especially close, are often termed "purple."

Following the 2018 and 2020 elections, the Republican Party continued to hold a majority of state legislatures and a majority of governorships.

Dominated by the Democratic Party:
  had Republican governors as late as 2011 (except 1975–1983 and 1999–2003) but has voted for Democrats in national races and has a legislature dominated by the Democrats since the 1990s. Due to the top two primary election, many statewide and local races are contested by two members of the Democratic Party in the general election. State Legislatures are controlled by the Democrats since 1970 (except 1994–1996).
 United States presidential election, 2016: Hillary Clinton (Democratic) 61.73% and won 55 electoral votes
 United States Senate election, 2016: Democrats 61.6%
 State Assembly election, 2016: Democrats 61.08% and won 55 of 80 seats
 United States House of Representatives elections Democrats 63.91% and won 39 of 53 seats
  has been continuously governed by Democrats since the Home Rule Act of 1973 was passed.
  has been dominated by Democrats since the Democratic Revolution of 1954. Beforehand, the then-Territory of Hawaii was dominated by Republicans and a sugar oligarchy.
  has an overwhelmingly Democratic population. Democrats have controlled all statewide offices since 2006 (not counting the governor, a Republican was last elected statewide in 2002).
 , while once a heavily Republican state, has had only one Republican governor since 1975, has voted Democrat in every Presidential election since 1988, and had no Republican statewide elected officials from 2002 until the election of Dennis Richardson as Oregon Secretary of State in 2016.

Dominated by the Republican Party:
 : dominated by Republicans since the mid-1990s.
  has been dominated by Republicans for most of its existence, with no Democratic governors since 1994 and only two years in which the State Senate was tied evenly since 1960.
 : dominated by Republicans since the mid-1990s.
 : dominated by Republicans since the mid-1990s.
  has been dominated by Republicans for most of its existence, aside from a few Democratic and Populist governments and coalitions with Republicans, with only three elected high officials and two years of State Senate dominance since 1979.
  has been dominated by Republicans for most of its existence, except for Democratic dominance during the Fifth Party System and between 1917 and 1920, the 1890s, and between 1959 and 1984.
  has been dominated by Republicans for most of its existence, with only four years where a house of the legislature has been Democratic since 1939, and mostly Republican governors during that period.

Asia and Oceania
 
 : The Liberal Party has held power for eleven years as of 2022.

 Awami League (AL): Led by Prime Minister Sheikh Hasina, in office since 6 January 2009; In power since 2008
 2018 Bangladeshi general election: 81.93% and 259 of 300 seats

 Cambodian People's Party (CPP): Led by Prime Minister Hun Sen, in office since 14 January 1985 
 In power since 1993 (sole legal party 1979–1992)
 2017 Cambodian communal elections: 50.76% and 6,503 of 11,572 councillors
 2018 Cambodian Senate election: 95.95% and 58 of 58 seats
 2018 Cambodian general election: 76.85% and 125 of 125 seats

 Chinese Communist Party (CCP): Led by CCP General Secretary and Paramount leader Xi Jinping, in office since November 15, 2012
 In power since 1949 (sole ruling party from 1954)
 Congressional election, 2017–18: 70.0% and 2,119 of 2,980 Seats
 Eight other parties are legally permitted with the CCP as the United Front as the PRC ruled as a one-party state.
 
 Gujarat: Since 1998, the Bharatiya Janata Party has consecutively ruled the state legislature of Gujarat.
Odisha: Since 2000, the Biju Janata Dal has dominated the state legislature of Odisha without interruption.
 
 : Dominated by the Indonesian Democratic Party of Struggle since 2003
  Depok City: Led by Prosperous Justice Party politicians since 2005
 : The Prosperous Justice Party won every gubernatorial elections in 2010, 2015 and 2020

 : Led by Parti Islam Se-Malaysia (PAS) under various coalitions (Angkatan Perpaduan Ummah, Barisan Alternatif, Pakatan Rakyat, Gagasan Sejahtera, Perikatan Nasional) since 1990. PAS also lead the state government as a single party from 1955 to 1973 and as a component party of Barisan Nasional from 1973 to 1978, when they were expelled from BN in the aftermath of the 1977 Kelantan Emergency.
 : Led by Barisan Nasional and its predecessor, Perikatan since 1955. Currently lead a coalition government with Pakatan Harapan after the 2022 Pahang state election.
 : Led by Pakatan Harapan and its predecessor, Pakatan Rakyat since 2008
 : Led by Gabungan Parti Sarawak and its predecessors (BN Sarawak, Sarawak Alliance) since independence (1963)
 : Led by Pakatan Harapan and its predecessor, Pakatan Rakyat since 2008
 
 Liberal Democratic Party (LDP): Led by Prime Minister Fumio Kishida, in office since 4 October 2021
 In power 1955–1993, 1994–2009 and since 2012 (governed in coalition with Komeito since 1999) Was also briefly out of power in 1993 due to an oppositional coalition. 
 Parliamentary election 2017: LDP 284 of 465 seats (Governing coalition 313 of 465 seats).
  
 West Bank Government (Fatah): Led by President Mahmoud Abbas, in office since 15 January 2005 (as Chairman of the PLO since 26 October 2004) 
 In power since 1994
 2005 Palestinian presidential election: Mahmoud Abbas 62.52%
 Gaza Strip Government (Hamas): Led by Chairman of the Political Bureau Ismail Haniyeh, in office since 6 May 2017 (as Prime Minister from 29 March 2006, to 2 June 2014) 
 In power since 2007
 2006 Palestinian legislative election: 74 of 132 seats and 44.45%
 
 People's Action Party (PAP): Led by Prime Minister Lee Hsien Loong, in office since 12 August 2004
 In power since 5 June 1959
 Parliamentary election, 2020: PAP won 61.2% of the popular vote and 83 out of 93 seats
 Presidential election, 2017: Former PAP member Halimah Yacob won (sole candidate)
 
 National Progressive Front (NPF), a coalition of 10 parties led by the Arab Socialist Ba'ath Party – Syria Region (Baath Party): Led by President Bashar al-Assad, in office since 17 July 2000
 In power since 8 March 1963
 Presidential election, 2021: Bashar al-Assad 95.1%
 Parliamentary election, 2020: Baath Party won 167 of 250 seats (National Progressive Front 183 of 250)
 
 People's Democratic Party of Tajikistan is headed by President Emomalii Rahmon: In power since 1994 
 Presidential election in 2013 won by Emomali Rahmon 83.92%.
 Since the Parliamentary election in 2020 holds 47 seats in Assembly of Representatives
 
 Democratic Party of Turkmenistan is headed by Kasymguly Babaev since August 18, 2013
 Presidential election in 2017 won by Gurbanguly Berdimuhammedow 97.69%
 Parliamentary election, 2018: 55 of 125 seats in the Assembly of Turkmenistan
 In power since independence in 1990
 Sole legal party until 2012

Eurasia

 New Azerbaijan Party (YAP) has been in power essentially continuously since 1993.
 Parliamentary election, 2020: 72 of 125 seats
 Presidential election, 2018: Ilham Aliyev 86.02%

 Georgian Dream (GD) has been in power with an overall majority in Parliament since 2012.
 Parliamentary election, 2020: 48.22% and 90 of 150 seats
 Presidential election, 2018: Salome Zourabichvili 59.5% (endorsed by GD, GD amended the constitution to abolish popular vote for the presidency by 2024)
 Municipality mayors: 64 of 65

 Amanat 
 Parliamentary election in 2016: 82.20% and 84 of 107 seats in the Majilis
 Presidential election in 2022: Kassym-Jomart Tokayev 81.31%

 United Russia
 Led by Dmitry Medvedev (President 2008–2012, Prime Minister 2012–2020)
 In power since 2003
 Presidential election, 2018: Vladimir Putin 76.7% (endorsed by United Russia and several other parties, but ran as an independent)
 Parliamentary election, 2021: 49.82% and 324 of 450 seats
 Governors: 60 of 85

United Ossetia
 Led by Anatoliy Bibilov
 In power since 2014 (a continuation of the governing 2001–2014 Unity Party, now defunct)
 Parliamentary election, 2014: 44.84% and 20 of 34 seats
 Presidential election, 2017: Anatoliy Bibilov 54.80%

Europe

 
Austrian People's Party: Led by Johanna Mikl-Leitner, Governor (since 2017); In power since 1945
 State election, 2018: VPNÖ 49.64% and won 29 of 56 seats
 European Parliament election, 2019: ÖVP 40.1%
 2019 Austrian legislative election: ÖVP 42.3%
 
 Austrian People's Party: Led by Günther Platter, Governor (since 2008); In power since 1945
 2018 Tyrolean state election: TVP 44.26%
 European Parliament election, 2019: ÖVP 42.6%
 2019 Austrian legislative election: ÖVP 45.8%
 
 Social Democratic Party of Austria: Led by Michael Ludwig, Mayor (since 2018); In power since 1945
 State election, 2015: SPÖ 39.59%
 2019 Austrian legislative election: SPÖ 27.1%
 European Parliament election, 2019: SPÖ 30.3%
 
 Austrian People's Party: Led by Markus Wallner, Governor (since 2011); In power since 1945
 European Parliament election, 2019: ÖVP 34.6%
 2019 Austrian legislative election: ÖVP 36.6%
 State election, 2019: VVP 43.53%
 
 Austrian People's Party: Led by Thomas Stelzer, Governor (since 2017); In power since 1945
 State election, 2015: OÖVP 36.37%
 2019 Austrian legislative election: ÖVP 36.8%
 European Parliament election, 2019: ÖVP 35.1%

 
Christian Social Union in Bavaria (CSU): Led by Markus Söder, Minister-President (since 2018); In power since 1946, with a sole hiatus from 1954 to 1957. From 1966 to 2003 and 2013 to 2018, CSU ruled with an absolute majority. Its share of votes peaked in 1974 at 62%. From 2003 to 2008, CSU held a two-thirds supermajority in the Bavarian Landtag. Since the 2010s, the CSU's dominance has somewhat eroded (31.7% in the 2021 German federal election; 37.2% in the 2018 Bavarian state election), but it is still considered impossible to form a government led by another party in Bavaria.

 Christian Democratic Union (CDU): In power since the establishment of the state in 1990. CDU ruled with an absolute majority until 2004, and even a two-thirds supermajority in the Landtag from 1994 to 2004. Its popularity peaked at 56.9% in the 1999 election. In the 2010s, CDU's dominance eroded significantly. In the 2017 German federal election, Saxony's CDU came in second place for the first time in the history of the state, reaching 26.9%, behind the far-right Alternative für Deutschland. Due to the irreconcilability of left-wing and right-wing opposition parties, it is still considered impossible to form a state government led by another party than CDU.
 
 Fidesz–KDNP: In power since 2010 (won in the European Parliament election, 2009: 14 of 22 of seats for Hungary)
 Led by Viktor Orbán, Prime Minister (since 2010)
 2022 Hungarian parliamentary election: 54.13% and qualified majority, 135 of 199 seats
 European Parliament election, 2019: 52.56% and 13 of 21 of seats for Hungary
 
 
 Democratic Party: In power since 2007
 Regional election, 2020: PD 34.7% and 23 of 50 seats
 European Parliament election, 2019: PD 31.2% 
 Chamber of Deputies, 2022: PD 28.1%
 
 Centre-right coalition: In power since 1994; Came in second place in Lombardy to the Democratic Party in the European Parliament election, 2014: FI+LN+FdI 34.3%
 Regional election, 2018: CDX 51.23% and won 49 of 80 seats
 Presidential election, 2018: Attilio Fontana 49.7%
 Chamber of Deputies election, 2018: CDX 46.9%
 Senate election, 2018: CDX 47.2%
 
 Democratic Party: In power since 2007
 Regional election, 2015: PD 48.1%  and 25 of 41 seats
 European Parliament election, 2014: PD 52.5% 
 Chamber of Deputies election, 2018: PD 29.6%
 Senate election, 2018: PD 30.5%
 
 South Tyrolean People's Party: In power since 1948 (The German Association dominated from 1921 and before that it was part of Tyrol)
 1924 Italian general election: German Association, part of Lists of Slavs and Germans 80%
 Provincial elections, 2013: SVP 45.7% and 17 of 35 seats
 European Parliament election, 2014: SVP 48.0% 
 Chamber of Deputies election, 2018: SVP 48.8%
 Senate election, 2018: SVP 49.8%
 
 Centre-right coalition: In power since 1994
 Came in second place in Veneto to the Democratic Party in the European Parliament election, 2014: FI+LN+FdI 33.2%
 Regional election, 2015: CDX 52.2% and won 29 of 51 seats
 Presidential election, 2015: Luca Zaia 50.1%
 Chamber of Deputies election, 2018: CDX 48.1%
 Senate election, 2018: CDX 48.2%
 
 
 Self-declared state
 Obnovlenie: In power since 2005
 Parliamentary election, 2020: Renewal 27.79% and 29 of 33 seats
 Presidential election, 2016: Vadim Krasnoselsky, as independent candidate, 59.16%
  (Poland A and B)
 Law and Justice: Dominates in Southeast Poland, controls the Presidency, Sejm (since 2015), and government
 Civic Platform: Dominates in Warsaw and Northwest Poland
 
Socialist Party: In power since 1995 with exception between 2002 to 2005 and 2011 to 2015 
 : the Social Democratic Party has dominated political life in the autonomous region of Madeira since the first regional elections, in 1976. Alberto João Jardim served as President of the Regional Government uninterruptedly from 1978 to 2015.
 Local elections, 2013: SDP 34.81%
 European Parliament election, 2014 (in Madeira): SDP 31.0%
 Regional election, 2015: SDP 48.56% and 25 of 47 seats
 2015 Portuguese legislative election (in Madeira): SDP 37.8% and 3 of 6 seats
 
 The Sammarinese Christian Democratic Party (PDCS) have always had a plurality of seats in the Grand and General Council since 1951, However it has not consistently formed the government. From 2016 to 2020 it was in opposition. The predecessor of the PDCS the Sammarinese People's Party was already biggest party in 1920.
 General election, 2019. PDCS 33.35%
 
 Serbian Progressive Party: In power since 2012
 Led by Aleksandar Vučić, two-term Prime Minister (2014–2017) and President (2017–present)
 Parliamentary election, 2022: SNS 44.27% and 120 of 250 seats
 2020 Vojvodina provincial election: SNS 61.58% and 76 of 120
 Presidential election, 2022: Aleksandar Vučić, 60.01%
 

 Basque Nationalist Party, in power in the Basque Government from 1979 to 2009, and again since 2012.
 Basque election, 2020: PNV 38.7%, 31 of 75 seats.
 Spanish Parliament election, November 2019: PNV 32.0%, 6 of 18 seats.

 Spanish Socialist Workers' Party, in power in the Castilian-Manchegan Government from 1982 to 2011, and again since 2015.
 Castilian-Manchegan election, 2019: PSOE 44.1%, 19 of 33 seats.
 Spanish Parliament election, November 2019: PSOE 33.1%, 9 of 21 seats.

 People's Party, in power in the Castile and León Government continuously since 1987.
 Castilian-Leonese election, 2022: PP 31.4%, 31 of 81 seats.
 Spanish Parliament election, November 2019: PP 31.6%, 13 of 31 seats.

 People's Party, in power in the Government of the Community of Madrid continuously since 1995.
 Madrilenian election, 2021: PP 44.8%, 65 of 136 seats.
 Spanish Parliament election, November 2019: PP 26.9%, 10 of 37 seats.

 Spanish Socialist Workers' Party, in power in the Extremaduran Government from 1983 to 2011, and again since 2015.
 Extremaduran election, 2019: PSOE 46.8%, 34 of 65 seats.
 Spanish Parliament election, November 2019: PSOE 38.3%, 5 of 10 seats.

 People's Party, in power in the Galician Government from 1982 to 1987, from 1990 to 2005, and again since 2009.
 Galician election, 2020: PP 47.6%, 41 of 75 seats.
 Spanish Parliament election, November 2019: PP 31.9%, 10 of 23 seats.
 :
 Conservative Party
 Governing party in the Parliament of the United Kingdom for most of the 20th century and in government since 2010.
 : 
 Scottish National Party 
 Has been the largest party in the Scottish Parliament since 2007. It has also won the majority of seats to the House of Commons in Scotland in every election since 2015.
 : 
 Welsh Labour 
 Has won the majority of seats to the House of Commons in Wales in every election since 1922. It has also been the largest party in the Senedd (formerly known as the National Assembly for Wales, until 2020) since its inception in 1999.

Formerly dominant parties

North America
:
: The Social Credit Party held power for all but 3 years between 1952 and 1991, winning 11 of the 12 elections held during this 39-year period. In 1991 the party was defeated by the centre-left BC NDP and its role as the province's main centre-right vehicle was inherited by the BC Liberals who themselves governed from 2001-2017 before also being defeated by the NDP. 
: has been home to two lengthy conservative dynasties, that of the Social Credit Party of Alberta which governed from 1935-1971 and the Progressive Conservative Association of Alberta which governed from 1971-2015. In 2015 the Alberta Tories were defeated by the left-leaning Alberta NDP in a seismic electoral upset. In turn, the province's first (and so far only) NDP government was defeated by the newly formed United Conservative Party of Alberta in 2019.
: The Saskatchewan New Democratic Party (NDP) and its predecessor the Cooperation Commonwealth Federation (CCF) won 12 out of 16 elections between 1944-2007. Today, the Saskatchewan NDP is the province's only opposition party with legislative representation.
: The Liberal Party of Newfoundland and Labrador held power from confederation in 1949 until Joey Smallwood's resignation as Premier in 1972 during the hung Parliament created by the 1971 Newfoundland general election.
: The Nova Scotia Liberal Party, in the Province of Nova Scotia, held office in an unbroken period from 1882 to 1925. During the period from 1867 to 1956, the party was in power for 76 of 89 years, most of that time with fewer than 5 opposition members.
: Ontario's party system was once a dominant party system, with the Liberal Party of Ontario being the only political party to form government from 1871 to 1905; and having won the majority of the seats available in all twelve elections from 1871 to 1902. The turn of the 20th century saw a shift in party dominance from the Liberal Party of Ontario to the Progressive Conservative Party of Ontario, with the latter winning 22 of the 28 elections held in the 20th century. From 1943 to 1985, the Progressive Conservatives won 13 consecutive elections, forming the provincial government for 42 years. Known as the 'Big Blue Machine,' the Progressive Conservative government was known for having Red Tory leanings particularly under Premiers Leslie Frost, John Robarts and Bill Davis. Although the Progressive Conservatives won the most seats in the 1985 election, the party was unable to form government for the first time in 42 years, with the Liberal Party forming a minority government with a confidence and supply arrangement with the Ontario New Democratic Party. The 42 year PC dynasty was followed by a decade of political upheavel in which the Liberals were defeated by the NDP in 1990 which in turn was defeated by the PC Party in 1995.
: The Union Nationale, in the Province of Quebec, held office uninterrupted from 1944 until 1960 with Quiet revolution. And nearly with the Quebec Liberal Party throughout province's political history with start from 1897 to 1935, then a second time in 1985 and 1989, and lastly third time in 2003 to 2018 with a short interruption of 2 years when the Parti Québécois won a minority government from 2012 to 2014.
: 
The Institutional Revolutionary Party (PRI) and its predecessors (Partido Laborista Mexicano (PLM) (1920–1928), Partido Nacional Revolucionario (PNR) (1929–1938) and Partido de la Revolución Mexicana (PRM) (1938–1946)) in Mexico held the presidency from 1920 to 2000. The party governed all states until 1989 and controlled both chambers of congress until 1997. As of 2022, the PRI has continued an uninterrupted hold of the governorship in three states: Coahuila, Hidalgo and the State of Mexico.
The Liberal Party, later known as the National Porfirist Party, ruled consistently from 1867 to 1911. 
:
 During the "Era of Good Feelings," the Democratic-Republican Party dominated national politics with no effective opposition from the Federalist Party or any third parties, allowing James Monroe to run unopposed in the 1820 presidential election.  This dominance continued until the rise of the American Whig Party circa 1830.
 From 1933 to 1995, the Democratic Party held a majority in both Houses of Congress except 1947 to 1949, 1953 to 1955 which Republicans controlled both Houses of Congress and 1981 to 1987 which Republicans controlled the Senate. 
 New England:
 had mostly Republican governors from 1857 to 1997 (140 years) – Republicans held the governorship for all but 15 years (were only twice out of office for more than two consecutive years)
 had only Republican governors from 1855 to 1963 (108 years)
 Southern United States:
 Until the 1990s, the South (usually defined as coextensive with the former Confederacy) was known as the "Solid South" due to its states' reliable support of the Democratic Party, which at that time had a strong conservative wing. Several states had an unbroken succession of Democratic governors from half a century to over a century.
, 1874–1987 (113 years)
, 1874–1967 (93 years)
, 1877–1967 (90 years)
 Georgia, 1872–2003 (131 years)
, 1877–1980 (103 years)
, 1876–1992 (116 years)
, 1901–1973 (72 years)
, 1907–1963 (56 years)
, 1876–1975 (99 years)
, 1923–1971 (48 years)
, 1874–1979 (105 years)
, 1869–1970 (101 years)

Caribbean and Central America
: The Antigua Labour Party in Antigua and Barbuda, 1960–1971 and 1976–2004. They are currently ruling, but may not be yet considered dominant. 
: The Barbados Labour Party in the Barbados from 1994 to 2008.They are currently ruling, but may not be yet considered dominant. The Democratic Labour Party from 1961 to 1976.
: The Progressive Liberal Party in the Bahamas from 1967 to 1992
: The United Bermuda Party in Bermuda from 1968 to 1998.
:
The National Republican Party ruled Costa Rica between 1932 and 1948. 
The National Liberation Party is often referred as the hegemonic or dominant party between 1953 and 1983 as it won most elections, it held the majority in the Legislative Assembly between 1953 and 1978, held consecutive governments several times and was only defeated in 1958, 1966 and 1978 thanks to the entire right-wing opposition nominating a common candidate in coalition. Only after 1983 with the merge of the Unity Coalition into the Social Christian Unity Party Costa Rica started its two-party system.
Non-Partisan Liberals dominated Costa Rican presidency from 1846 to 1868.
: The Blue Party from 1879 to 1899. The Dominican Liberation Party from 2004 to 2020.
: 
 The Liberal Party (PL) held the presidency from 1871 to 1903
 The National Democratic Party (PDN) held the presidency from 1913 to 1931
 The National Pro Patria Party (PNPP) held the presidency from 1933 to 1944
 The National Conciliation Party (PCN) held the presidency from 1962 to 1979
 The Nationalist Republican Alliance (ARENA) held the presidency from 1989 to 2009.
: The Conservative Party in Guatemala from 1851 and 1871. The Liberal Party in Guatemala from 1871 and 1920, 1921 and 1926, 1931 and 1944.
: National Party governs from 1933 to 1956, from 2010 to 2022.
:
The Partido Liberal Nacionalista of the Somoza family held effective control from the 1930s to 1979. It was never the sole legal party, but elections were often fraught with accusations of fraud and improbable results.
Conservative Party ruled from 1857 to 1893
: The Popular Democratic Party in Puerto Rico from 1949 to 1969.
: People's National Movement ruled from 1956 to 1986.

South America
: 
The National Autonomist Party (PAN) of Argentina from 1874 to 1916.
The Federalist Party from 1829 to 1852. 
: The conservative Liberal Democratic Party ruled the province between 1922 and 1943.
: Liberal Party ruled from 1899 to 1920. The Revolutionary Nationalist Movement (MNR) in Bolivia from 1952 to 1964.
: The National Renewal Alliance Party (ARENA) in Brazil from 1965 to 1979
: From 1829 to 1871, a successive number of parties (Pelucones to Conservative to National Party) governed Chile. From 1990 to 2010 the Concertación Coalition hold presidency. 
: The Liberal Party of Colombia from 1861 to 1886, and later on from 1886 to 1900 as the brief successor party National Party, and Colombian Conservative Party from 1900 to 1930
: Ecuadorian Radical Liberal Party ruled from 1895 to 1925. PAIS Alliance ruled from 2007 to 2021.
: The People's National Congress from 1964 to 1992. The People's Progressive Party from 1992 to 2015. 
: The Colorado Party of Paraguay, 1880–1904 and 1948–2008. They were the sole legal party from 1947 to 1962. Liberal Party from 1912 to 1936
: The Colorado Party of Uruguay, between 1865 and 1959
: Conservative Party ruled from 1830 to 1851. Fifth Republic Movement ruled from 1999 until its merging with the newly created United Socialist Party of Venezuela in 2007, which has been the ruling party since then.

Europe

 : The Republican Party of Armenia controlled the country from 1999 until 2018, when it lost all of its seats in parliament after the 2018 Armenian revolution and the 2018 parliamentary election.
: The Austrian People's Party ruled as the dominant governing coalition leader from 1945 to 1970, and the Social Democratic Party of Austria, under a similar arrangement, from 1970 to 2000.
: The Cisleithania Minister-Presidency was dominated by the Constitutional Party from 1871 to 1893.  
: The Social Democratic Workers' Party of Austria (predecessor of the SPÖ, in power since 1945), dominated Vienna between 1911 and 1934.
: The Christian Social Party (predecessor of the ÖVP, in power since 1945), dominated Lower Austria between 1907 and 1934.
: The Christian Social Party (predecessor of the ÖVP), dominated Upper Austria between 1907 and 1934.
: The Christian Social Party (predecessor of the ÖVP), dominated Vorarlberg between 1907 and 1934.
: The Christian Social Party (predecessor of the ÖVP), dominated Tyrol between 1907 and 1934.
: The Salzburger Volkspartei, the ÖVP and their predecessors dominated Salzburg between 1919 and 2004.
: The Steirische Volkspartei, the ÖVP and their predecessors dominated Styria between 1907 and 2005.
: The Catholic Party sent Prime Ministers from 1884 to 1937. The Catholic People's Party sent Prime Ministers from 1979 to 1999.
: The Christian Social Party and the Christen-Democratisch en Vlaams dominated Flanders from at least 1968 to 1999.
: GERB was the ruling party from 2009 to 2021 (with an exception from 2013 to 2014). It is the biggest Bulgarian party.
: The Croatian Democratic Union was in power from the first multi-party elections in 1990, when Croatia was still a constituent republic of SFR Yugoslavia, until it lost the parliamentary and presidential elections in 2000. For most of the 1990s, the party had an absolute majority in both the Chamber of Representatives and the Chamber of Counties, while its chairman, Franjo Tuđman, was President of Croatia under a de facto superpresidential system of government until his death in 1999.
: The National Landowners, and later the Højre, ruled Denmark from 1874 to 1901. 
: The Agrarian League, later the Centre Party, dominated the Presidency under Urho Kekkonen from 1956 to 1982.  
: During the tenure of Napoleon III (first as president 1848 to 1852 then as Emperor from 1852 to 1870), the Bonapartists were a loose ruling political organization.  Since the Fifth Republic, the main presidential parties, Les Républicains (centre-right) or the Parti Socialiste (centre-left), were the biggest parties in every presidential election, until both parties lost dominance in France since 2017, as centrist politician Emmanuel Macron of En Marche became president, with French right-wing leader Marine Le Pen as the main opponent. Both parties have taken dominance since the 2017 French presidential election.
: The Union of Citizens of Georgia was the dominant political force from its establishment in 1995 to its dissolution and overthrow in 2003 in the Rose Revolution, during which the party's leader and President, Eduard Shevardnadze, was ousted. 
: The Christian Democratic Union ruled West Germany and later a unified Germany from its establishment in 1949 to 1969, and again from 1982 to 1998 and from 2005 to 2021. 
: The Christian Democratic Union of Germany ruled from 1953 to 2011 and was the biggest party until 2016 (except in Württemberg-Baden for 1950–1952), but is still the biggest party at the German federal elections and European Parliament elections. In the predecessor state of Baden, the Centre Party was the biggest party during the Weimar era until 1930.
: The Bavarian Patriot Party (until 1887), the Centre Party (until 1918) and the Bavarian People's Party were the biggest parties in the Bavarian Landtag from 1869 to 1933 and ruled from 1920 to 1933.
 (not part of Germany at the time): The Centre Party won every Landesrat election from 1922 to 1935.
 (not part of Germany at the time): The Saarland Christian People's Party held the majority from 1947 to 1955, which was broken by the similar CDU in 1955.
: The Christian Democratic Union of Germany ruled from the return of the Saar to (West) Germany in 1959 to 1980. In the Landtag elections, the CDU reached between 36.6% in 1955 and 49.1% in 1975; the CDU also dominated federal elections (except in 1972), and in the 1979 European Parliament election, the CDU/CSU won 46.4%.
: From the establishment of the state, the Christian Democratic Union of Germany ruled without interruption until 2014, with an absolute majority from 1999 to 2009. Since 2014, it has been in opposition.

: The Deák Party (which merged with the Left Centre to form the Liberal Party in 1875) ruled Hungary from 1867 to 1905, and the National Party of Work between 1910 and 1918.
: The Unity Party and the Party of National Unity (renamed Party of Hungarian Life in 1939) governed the Kingdom of Hungary from 1922 to 1944.
: After the elected Prime Minister Ferenc Nagy was forced into exile in May 1947, the Hungarian Communist Party became the Hungary's de facto ruling party until formally declaring the country to be a single-party state in August 1949.
: Ireland's Fianna Fáil was the largest party in Dáil Éireann between 1932 and 2011 and in power for 61 of those 79 years. However, the party were heavily defeated in the 2011 Irish general election, coming third.
: Italy's Christian Democracy dominated Italian politics for almost 50 years as the major party in every coalition that governed the country from 1944 until its demise amid a welter of corruption allegations in 1992–1994. The main opposition to the Christian democratic governments was the Italian Communist Party.
 Emilia-Romagna: The Italian Socialist Party dominated the region from 1909 until the rise of Fascism.
 Emilia-Romagna: The Italian Communist Party dominated the region from 1946 until 1991.
 Emilia-Romagna: The Democratic Party of the Left dominated the region from 1991 until 1998.
 Emilia-Romagna: The Democrats of the Left dominated the region from 1998 until 2007.
 Tuscany: The Italian Communist Party dominated the region from 1946 until 1953, and then from 1963 until 1991.
 Tuscany: The Democratic Party of the Left dominated the region from 1991 until 1998.
 Tuscany: The Democrats of the Left dominated the region from 1998 until 2007. 
: The Progressive Citizens' Party governed from 1928 to 1970.  
 : The Christian Social People's Party (CSV), with its predecessor, Party of the Right, governed Luxembourg continuously from 1915 to 2013, except for 1974–1979. However, Luxembourg has a coalition system, and the CSV has been in coalition with at least one of the other two leading parties for all but four years. It has always won a plurality of seats in parliamentary elections, although it lost the popular vote in 1964 and 1974.
 : The Nationalist Party dominated the Maltese political scene from 1988 to 2013, when the Labour Party won the government in the 2013 general election.
: Rally & Issues governed the National Assembly from 1962 to 2003. 
 : The Democratic Party of Socialists (DPS) ruled Montenegro from 1990 to 2020, having been defeated in the 2020 election. 
: The Norwegian Labour Party ruled from 1935 to 1965 (including the 5 years of Government-in-exile during World War II), though it has been the biggest party in Norway since 1927 and has been in power many other times.
: 
The Portuguese Republican Party, during most of the Portuguese First Republic's existence (1910–1926): After the coup that put an end to Portugal's constitutional monarchy in 1910, the electoral system, which had always ensured victory to the party in government, was left unchanged. Before 1910, it had been the reigning monarch's responsibility to ensure that no one party remain too long in government, usually by disbanding Parliament and calling for new elections. The republic's constitution added no such proviso, and the Portuguese Republican Party was able to keep the other minor republican parties (monarchic parties had been declared illegal) from winning elections. On the rare occasions when it was ousted from power, it was overthrown by force, and it was again by the means of a counter-coup that it returned to power, until its final fall, with the republic itself, in 1926.
As a semi-presidential republic, Portugal's President has significant residual power. From 1986 to 2006, the Presidency was in the hand of the Socialist Party; since 2006, the Presidents were members of the Social Democratic Party.

: The PSOE-A party (the Andalusian branch of nationwide PSOE) was the ruling party in the Andalusian Autonomous Government continuously between 1978 and 2019, being also the most voted party in all elections for the Parliament of Andalusia during that interval, except one (2012). After the 2018 Andalusian election, a right-to-centre coalition led by the People's Party entered office, and in 2022 the People's Party achieved an absolute majority.
: The Convergence and Union coalition (federated political party after 2001) in Catalonia governed the autonomous Catalan government from 1980 to 2003, under the leadership of Jordi Pujol, with parliamentary absolute majority or in coalition with other smaller parties. The party later governed again from 2010 until its dissolution in 2015.
: The People's Party of the Valencian Community (the Valencian branch of nationwide People's Party) was the ruling party in the Valencian Autonomous Government between 1995 and 2015, being the most voted party in all  elections for the Valencian Parliament during that interval. After the 2015 Valencian elections, a left-to-centre coalition entered office.
: From 1848 to 1891, the Free Democratic Party held all seven seats of the Federal Council, thus having full control of the Swiss Directorial Government. 
: The Swedish Social Democratic Party in Sweden governed from 1932 to 2006, except for some months in 1936 (1936–1939 and 1951–1957 in coalition with the Farmers' League, 1939–1945 at the head of a government of national unity), 1976–1982 and 1991–1994. The party is still the largest party in Sweden and has been so in every general election since 1917 (hence the largest party even before the universal suffrage was introduced in 1921). The former Prime Minister and party leader Tage Erlander led the Swedish government for an uninterrupted tenure of 23 years (1946–1969), the longest in any democracy so far. Since 2006, the party support has declined, but in 2014, it returned to government, although its centre-left coalition has no majority.
: In Turkey's single-party period lasting until 1945, the Republican People's Party (CHP) was the major political organisation of the single-party state. However, the CHP faced two opposition parties during this period, both established upon the request of the founder of the Republic of Turkey and CHP leader, Mustafa Kemal Atatürk, in efforts to allegedly jump-start multiparty democracy in Turkey. The pro-Kurdish Peoples' Democratic Party was the dominant party in the mainly Kurdish southeast from 1991 until the 2016 Turkish coup d'état attempt which resulted in massive purges and the takeover of municipalities by the state. The landslide election victories of the Justice and Development Party led to the party gaining majority in parliament between 2002 and 2018. Since the 2018 parliamentary election, the party has minority in the parliament and is in a coalition.
: 
The Conservative and Unionist Party, currently in government since 2010, previously held sole power or as the largest coalition partner from 1916 to 1923, from 1924 to 1929, from 1931 to 1945, from 1951 to 1964, from 1970 to 1974, and from 1979 to 1997.
Its predecessor, the Tories, governed from 1783 to 1806, and 1807 to 1830. 
The Whigs dominated the Kingdom of Great Britain's politics from 1714 to 1762 during the Whig supremacy.
: Scottish Labour won every election to the House of Commons in Scotland from 1964 to 2015, where it was heavily defeated and reduced to 1 seat. It controlled the Scottish Parliament from its inception in 1999 until the 2007 election where it lost to the SNP.
: The Ulster Unionist Party won every election between 1921 and 1972 in the former devolved administration of Northern Ireland.
: The League of Communists of Yugoslavia governed the country from 1944/1945 until the party's dissolution in 1990. 
: The Socialist Party of Serbia controlled the country from 1992 to 2000.

Asia
: In Bangladesh, the Awami League was the country's predominant political party between 1972 and 1975 and from 2009 to present. After the military coup of 1975, the Bangladesh Nationalist Party (BNP) became the dominant political force between 1977 and 1982. Under the autocratic regime of General Hussain Muhammad Ershad, the Jatiya Party was the dominant party between 1986 and 1990. Currently, Bangladesh Awami League again has become the dominant political force since 2008.
: The Anti-Fascist People's Freedom League in Burma (now Myanmar) from 1948 to 1962. The Union Solidarity and Development Party from 2011 to 2016 (as a military junta from 1988 to 2011).
: The Democratic Party was the dominant party in Cambodia from 1946 to 1955, The Sangkum in Cambodia was the dominant party under Prince Norodom Sihanouk as head of government from 1955 to 1970. Under the Khmer Republic the Social Republican Party was the dominant party under General Lon Nol from 1972 to 1975.
: The Kuomintang established a de facto one-party state in the Republic of China on the mainland and subsequently on Taiwan until political liberalization and the lifting of martial law in the late 1980s. The Kuomintang continued to dominate the political system until the victory of the opposition Democratic Progressive Party in the 2000 presidential election. Kuomintang maintained control of the Legislative Yuan until 2016.
: The Indian National Congress had continuously ruled the parliament of India and various state legislatures since independence in 1947 to 1977 and 1980 to 1989.
West Bengal: The Left Front, comprising parties such as the Communist Party of India (Marxist), the Communist Party of India, All India Forward Bloc and the Revolutionary Socialist Party had ruled the state legislature of West Bengal for 34 years (winning election for seven consecutive times from 1977 to 2011). 
: The Golkar (acronym of Golongan Karya or Functional Groups) organization, in power from 1971 to 1999 in support for President Suharto. 
: The Iran Novin Party dominated Iran's parliament, cabinet, and local councils from 1964 until Iran became a one-party state in 1975.
: Mapai in Israel was the dominant party from the establishment of the state of Israel in 1948 (and before 1944 they won the Assembly of Representatives since 1925) until merging into present-day Israeli Labor Party in 1968. The Labor Party started losing influence in the 1970s, particularly following the Yom Kippur War, and eventually lost power in the 1977 election. The Labor Party continued to participate in several coalition governments until 2009.
: Conservative parties: Liberal Party (South Korea) in power 1948–1960, Democratic Republican Party (South Korea) in power 1962–1980, Democratic Justice Party in power 1980–1990, Democratic Liberal Party (South Korea) in power 1990–1995, New Korea Party in power 1995–1997 and Saenuri Party in power 2008–2017.
: United National Party governed from 1977 to 1994, and the Sri Lanka Freedom Party governed from 1994 to 2015.
: Barisan Nasional (BN), in power from 1974 to 2018, defeated in 2018 election. Also in a coalition government with Perikatan Nasional from 2020 to 2022 in the wake of 2020 Malaysian political crisis, with BN leading from 2021 to 2022. Its predecessor Perikatan also held power from 1955 to 1973. After the 2022 Malaysian general election, despite currently in a coalition government led by Pakatan Harapan, BN is no longer dominant in the Malaysian politics.
: Barisan Nasional (and its predecessor Perikatan), in power from 1954 to 2018, defeated in 2018 election. Regained power in the wake of 2020 Malaysian political crisis and won the 2022 Johor state election.
: Barisan Nasional (and its predecessor Perikatan), in power from 1955 to 2008, defeated in 2008 election. Regained power in the 2013 state elections, but defeated again in the 2018 election.
: Barisan Nasional, in power from 1978, when they won the 1978 state election in Kelantan and governed in a coalition with BERJASA, until 1990, when BN were defeated in that year's election.
: Barisan Nasional (and its predecessor Perikatan), in power from 1955 to 2018, defeated in 2018 election. Regained power in the wake of 2020 Malaysian political crisis and won the 2021 Melaka state election.
: Barisan Nasional (and its predecessor Perikatan), in power from 1955 to 2018, defeated in 2018 election.
: Barisan Nasional, in power from 1974 to 2008 under main component party in Penang Gerakan, defeated in 2008 election. Gerakan as a single party also won state election in 1969, winning it from BN predecessor Perikatan, who held power in the state from 1955.
: Barisan Nasional, in power from 1974 to 2008, defeated in 2008 election. BN regained power in 2009 as a result of 2009 Perak constitutional crisis, and won the 2013 Perak state election. BN would lose the Perak government again after defeat in the 2018 state election, but regained power in the wake of 2020 Malaysian political crisis. Its predecessor Perikatan also held power from 1955 to 1969. Currently lead a coalition government with Pakatan Harapan after the 2022 Perak state election.
: Barisan Nasional (and its predecessor Perikatan), in power from 1955 to 2022, defeated in 2022 election. 
: Barisan Nasional, in power from 1976 to 1985 (led by component party BERJAYA), 1986 to 1990 (led by component party PBS), and from 1994 to 2018 (led by component party UMNO Sabah). Currently BN is in a coalition government with Gabungan Rakyat Sabah (GRS), led by BERSATU Sabah, after the 2020 Sabah state election. PBS also led the state government as a single party from 1985 to 1986, and as part of Gagasan Rakyat coalition from 1990 to 1994. Before BN, Perikatan Sabah (Sabah Alliance) holds power in Sabah from its independence in 1963 to 1976.
: Barisan Nasional, in power from 1974 to 2008, defeated in 2008 election. Its predecessor Perikatan also held power from 1955 to 1969. 
: Barisan Nasional (and its predecessor Perikatan), in power from 1955 to 2018, with exception to 1959-1961 and 1999-2004, when the state government was led by Parti Islam Se-Malaysia (PAS). Defeated in the 2018 election.
: The National Unity Party governed from 1983 to 2005. 
: The Nacionalista Party in the Philippines was the dominant party during various times in the nation's history from 1916–1941, and on 1945. From 1978 to 1986 Kilusang Bagong Lipunan operated as a dominant party. 
: General People's Congress, In power effectively from 1982 (1982-1990 sole legal party) to 2015, ceded effective control after Houthi takeover of Sana'a.

Africa
: The National Liberation Front had governed Algeria from 1962 to 1992, from 1992 to 1994 (sole legal party 1962 to 1989), and from 1999 to 2019. The current president, Abdelmadjid Tebboune, is affiliated with FLN, but its partisan power is significantly weakened after the 2021 parliamentary elections. 
: The Congress for Democracy and Progress from 1996 to 2014, under Blaise Compaoré, who ruled first as an independent after a coup from 1987 to 1989, then leads Organization for Popular Democracy – Labour Movement from 1989 to 1996.
: Union for National Progress (UPRONA) from 1962-1993 (from 1974 to 1992 as sole legal party).
: the Movement for the Social Evolution of Black Africa ruled from 1960 to 1981 (from 1962 to 1980 as sole legal party). 
: Patriotic Salvation Movement (Mouvement Patriotique de Salut de SMPS) governed from 1990 to 2021.
: The National Democratic Party (NDP) of Egypt, under various names, from 1952 to 2011 (as Arab Socialist Union, sole legal party 1953–1978)
: The People's Progressive Party in The Gambia from 1962 to 1994. The Alliance for Patriotic Reorientation and Construction under Yahya Jammeh from 1996 to 2017, with Jammeh ruling first under a Junta after a coup from 1994 to 1996.
: African Party for the Independence of Guinea and Cape Verde (PAIGC) governed from 1974 to 1999 (from 1974 to 1991 as the sole legal party).
: Democratic Party of Ivory Coast governed from 1960 to 1999 (from 1960 to 1990 as the sole legal party).
: The Kenya African National Union in Kenya from 1963 to 2002 (sole legal party 1982-1991).
: True Whig Party ruled consecutively from 1878 to 1980, in a de facto one-party state manner, though the country never explicitly banned opposition parties.
: People's Democratic Party (PDP) was in power from May 29, 1999, till May 29, 2015, when the opposition party All Progressives Congress (APC) won the presidential election in 2015.
: The Rhodesian Front in Rhodesia (now Zimbabwe), under the leadership of Ian Smith, from 1965 to 1980.
: The Socialist Party in Senegal from 1960 to 2000 (sole legal party 1966-1974).
: United Seychelles Party ruled from 1977 to 2020 (from 1977 to 1991 as sole legal party).
: The All People's Congress Party ruled from 1968 to 1992 (from 1978 to 1991 as sole legal party).
: The National Party in South Africa from 1948 to 1994.
: National Congress from 1998 to 2019 (1998 to 2005 as sole legal party).
: The Democratic Constitutional Rally in Tunisia, 1956–2011 (as the sole legal party between 1963 and 1981).
: The Movement for Multiparty Democracy from 1991 to 2011.

Oceania
: The Liberal Party (generally in a near-permanent Coalition with the National Party) held power federally from 1949 to 1972 and from 1975 to 1983 (31 out of 34 years). By the scheduled expiry of the 46th Parliament in 2022, the Liberal-National Coalition will have held power for 20 out of the 26 years between 1996 and 2022. Overall from 1949 to 2022, the Liberal Party will have held power for 52 out of the last 73 years. The longest-serving Prime Minister was Robert Menzies, who served from 1939 to 1941 (2 years) as a member of the United Australia Party, and from 1949 to 1966 (16 years) as leader of the Liberal Party.
: The Country Liberal Party held power from the granting of self-government in 1978 to 2001 (23 years).
: The Labor Party held power from 1941 to 1965 (24 years), and from 1976 to 1988 and 1995 to 2011 (28 out of 35 years) – in total 52 out of 70 years from 1941 to 2011.
: The Labor Party held power from 1915 to 1929 and from 1932 to 1957 (39 out of 42 years). The National Party then held power from 1957 to 1989 (32 years). These were facilitated by a Labor-designed malapportionment that favoured rural districts. The National Party under Joh Bjelke-Petersen increased the malapportionment with the Bjelkemander, allowing them to rule alone without the Liberals, and used the police to suppress dissent and opposition from Labor. The National Party dominance was ended by a corruption Inquiry, Bjelke-Petersen was forced to resign in disgrace and police and politicians were charged with crimes. Since 1989, Labor has held government aside from a National Party government 1996–1998 and Liberal-National Party government 2012–2015 (27 years of Labor government out of 32 years).
: The Liberal and Country League held power from 1933 to 1965 (32 years). The Labor Party held power from 1970 to 1979, from 1982 to 1993 and from 2002 to 2018 (26 out of 38 years).
: The Labor Party held power from 1934 to 1969 and from 1972 to 1982 (45 out of 48 years), from 1989 to 1992, and from 1998 to 2014 (16 years) – in total 64 out of 80 years from 1934 to 2014.
: The National Citizens' Reform League (1902-1909), the Deakinite Liberal Party (1909-1917) and the Nationalist Party (1917-1924) consecutively held power from 1902 to 1924 (22 years). The Country Party then ruled from 1924 to 1927 (3 years), followed by the Nationalist Party from 1928 to 1929 (1 year) in a coalition. The Country Party and the United Australia Party (later as the Liberal and Country Party) held power with and without a coalition from 1932 to 1945 (13 years) and 1947 to 1952 (5 years). The Liberal Party then held power from 1955 to 1982 (27 years). In total, conservative governments ruled 71 out of 80 years from 1902 to 1982.
: The Liberal Party held power from 1947 to 1983 with two one-term interruptions between 1953 and 1956 and 1971 to 1974 (30 out of 36 years).
: The Labor Party has held power since 2001 (in coalition with the Greens since 2012), previously holding government between 1989 and 1995 (24 years out of 30 years since self government).
: The Liberal Party governed from 1891 to 1912.
: The Human Rights Protection Party governed from 1982 to 2021.

See also 
 Loyal opposition
 Multi-party system
 Party of power
 Separation of powers
 Soft despotism
 Two-party system
 Types of democracy

Notes

References 

Political party systems
Elections
Political systems